The palmar metacarpal arteries (volar metacarpal arteries, palmar interosseous arteries) are three or four arteries that arise from the convexity of the deep palmar arch.

Structure 
The palmar metacarpal arteries arise from the convexity of the deep palmar arch.

They run distally upon the palmar interossei muscles. They anastomose at the clefts of the fingers with the common palmar digital arteries which arise from the superficial palmar arch.

References

External links
  ("Palm of the hand, deep dissection, anterior view")

Arteries of the upper limb